The Sukhodilska–Skhidna coal mine is a large underground coal mine located in Southeast Ukraine in Luhansk Oblast. Sukhodilska–Skhidna coal mine represents one of the largest coal reserves in Ukraine, having estimated reserves of 157.4 million tonnes. The annual coal production is around 712,000 tonnes.

Bituminous coal is mined using longwall mining at depths between 785 and 1,028 m. The mine began operation in 1980.

July 2011 mining accident
Shortly before 2 a.m. on 29 July 2011 an explosion occurred  underground in the mine. Initial reports indicated that at least 17 people were killed, and nine others were missing, but later all 26 were reported to have died.

Investigators suspect the accident was caused by a powerful explosion of methane. Mykhailo Volynets, the head of the Independent Trade Union of Miners, called the Sukhodilska–Skhidna coal mine "one of the most dangerous in Ukraine" due to buildups of methane and coal dust. The President of Ukraine ordered the government to set up a commission to investigate the accident.

Later that same day, Ukraine experienced a second fatal coal-mining accident when an elevator collapsed at the Bazhanov coal mine.

See also 

 Coal in Ukraine
 List of mines in Ukraine

References

External links
 Global Methane Initiative: Mine Details and reports

Suhodolskaya-Vostochnaya coal mine accident
2011 mining disasters
Coal mines in the Soviet Union
Coal mines in Ukraine
Coal mining disasters in Ukraine
Suhodolskaya-Vostochnaya coal mine accident
Economy of Luhansk Oblast
Suhodolskaya-Vostochnaya coal mine accident